Juan José Salvador Jiménez (born December 18, 1975 in Pechina, Almería) is a Spanish volleyball player who represented his native country at the 2000 Summer Olympics in Sydney, Australia. There he finished ninth place with the Men's National Team.

Sporting achievements

National team
 1995  Universiade

References

  Spanish Olympic Committee

1975 births
Living people
Spanish men's volleyball players
Volleyball players at the 2000 Summer Olympics
Olympic volleyball players of Spain
Mediterranean Games silver medalists for Spain
Competitors at the 2005 Mediterranean Games
Universiade medalists in volleyball
Mediterranean Games medalists in volleyball
Universiade silver medalists for Spain
Medalists at the 1995 Summer Universiade
Sportspeople from Almería